The Clodhopper is a 1917 American comedy drama film from Kay Bee Pictures starring Charles Ray and Margery Wilson and directed by Victor Schertzinger.

Plot
Isaac Nelson (French) is the tight-fisted president of a country bank and owns a farm, where his son Everett (Ray) works long hours every day, even on Sundays. Everett wears his father's cast-off clothes, and after his mother (Knott) buys him a mail order suit, Everett goes to a Fourth of July picnic with his sweetheart Mary Martin (Wilson). The father sees his wife in the field doing the son's work and, after forcing his son home from the picnic, beats him. Everett Nelson runs off to the big city (NYC) and tries to apply for a job as a janitor at a theater. There he meets a showman who puts him in a cabaret as a country dancer, doing a bizarre dance that Everett calls the "clodhopper slide," making $200 a week. Back in his hometown, rumors start to spread about the county bank making poor investments, creating a run on Mr. Nelson's bank. Everett's girlfriend, goes to New York to ask him for help and sways him to return home. Everett saves the bank and he and Mary get married.

Cast
Charles Ray - Everett Nelson
Charles K. French - Isaac Nelson, Everett's Father
Margery Wilson - Mary Martin
Lydia Knott - Mrs. Nelson
Tom Guise - Karl Seligman

Reception
Like many American films of the time, The Clodhopper was subject to cuts by city and state film censorship boards. The Chicago Board of Censors required one cut of a stamped postcard (the board cut closeups of all envelopes and postcards from films).

References

External links
 

1917 films
Films directed by Victor Schertzinger
1917 comedy-drama films
American silent feature films
American black-and-white films
1910s American films
Silent American comedy-drama films